The Tale of Tsar Saltan (tr.:Skazka o tsare Saltanye) is a 1984 Soviet traditionally animated feature film directed by Lev Milchin and Ivan Ivanov-Vano and produced at the Soyuzmultfilm studio.  It is an adaptation of the 1831 poem of the same name by Aleksandr Pushkin. There are few words in the film besides those of the poem itself, which is read from beginning to end by the narrator and the voice actors. Some portions of the poem are skipped.

The movie was adapted in English in the 1990s by Films by Jove for the series Stories from My Childhood.

Plot
Nearly identical to that of the original poem.

Three maidens under a window spun late in the evening ... And then much that was: both love, and slander, both treachery, and miracles, and set of magic adventures, and thirty three athletes, and, of course, happy end ...

Adventures of the brave tsarevitch Gvidon, the great tsarevna-Swan and the tsar Saltan will remind that love, fidelity and strength of mind always win!

Creators

Reception
Fellow film director Yuri Norstein, who had previously worked with Ivanov-Vano, praised Tsar Saltan'''s direction:

Home videoThe Tale of Tsar Saltan'' was first released on home video in the early 1990s, by film association Krupny Plan. Several years later, Krupny Plan again issued the film, in a VHS collection that contained other animated adaptations of Pushkin's fairy tales. The film was later released by original producer Soyuzmultfilm. In the 2000s it was reissued on DVD by both Soyuzmultfilm and Krupny Plan, and in 2003 with Soyuzmultfilm's collection "A Gold Collection of Favourite Cartoons”.

See also
 History of Russian animation
 List of animated feature-length films
 List of films based on poems

External links
 The film at the Animator.ru (English and Russian)
 
 The Tale of Tsar Saltan (1984) at Animatsiya.net, with subtitles in several languages including English
 The film at myltik.ru 

1984 films
Films based on fairy tales
Russian children's fantasy films
Films based on works by Aleksandr Pushkin
Films directed by Ivan Ivanov-Vano
1980s Russian-language films
Soviet animated films
Films based on Russian folklore
Animated films based on Slavic mythology
Soyuzmultfilm
1980s children's fantasy films
1984 animated films
Soviet children's films